Waynesboro Armory is a historic National Guard armory located at Waynesboro, Franklin County, Pennsylvania.  It was built in 1938, and is a one-story, "I"-plan brick building in the Moderne style.  It consists of three sections: administration building, drill hall, and stable.  Its construction was funded in part by the Public Works Administration.

It was added to the National Register of Historic Places in 1989.

References

Public Works Administration in Pennsylvania
Armories on the National Register of Historic Places in Pennsylvania
Moderne architecture in Pennsylvania
Infrastructure completed in 1938
Buildings and structures in Franklin County, Pennsylvania
National Register of Historic Places in Franklin County, Pennsylvania